Transketolase-like protein 2 is an enzyme that in humans is encoded by the TKTL2 gene.

References

Further reading